Operation Stampede 3 was a U.S. military operation conducted in Baghdad, Iraq, in July 2007 to try to correct the security situation.

Background
During Operation Stampede 3, which was conducted by the 3rd Brigade Combat Team, two large caches of ordnance were uncovered that could have been used to make a number of Improvised Explosive Devices (IED)s, more than 80 mortar rounds, 10 rockets, 15 pounds of plastic explosives, several artillery rounds, fuses, blasting caps and other components to be used to make IEDs.

Operation Stampede 3 was a sub-operation of Operation Marne Torch and Operation Phantom Thunder.

Participating Units

American Units
3rd Brigade Combat Team

See also

Operation Marne Torch
Operation Marne Avalanche
Operation Arrowhead Ripper
Operation Phantom Thunder

References

National Force – Iraq

Military operations of the Iraq War involving the United States
Military operations of the Iraq War involving Iraq
Military operations of the Iraq War in 2007
Iraqi insurgency (2003–2011)